Savor Flamenco (a play on Sabor Flamenco, "Flamenco Flavor") is the thirteenth studio album by the rumba catalana group Gipsy Kings. It was released on September 10, 2013 by Knitting Factory. The album was one of two recipients of the 2014 Grammy Award for Best World Music Album.

Track listing

References

External links
Savor Flamenco 

2013 albums
Gipsy Kings albums
Grammy Award for Best World Music Album
Knitting Factory Records albums